Santa Maria del Cedro is a town and comune in the province of Cosenza, Calabria, Italy. The town's name indicates the cultivation of the special diamante citron, which is used as Etrog by the Jews during their Feast of Tabernacles.

Sights include remains of Norman castle and aqueduct.

International relations

 
Santa Maria del Cedro is twinned with:
  Dolní Benešov, Czech Republic

References 

Cities and towns in Calabria